"I Won't Give Up on You" is a song by the group TKA from their 1990 second album Louder Than Love. The song was released in July 1990 as the second single from the album by Tommy Boy Records. It was written by Stephen Lironi and Dan Navarro and produced by Joey Gardner.

Track listing

 US 12" Single/CD Maxi

Charts

References

1990 singles
TKA songs
1990 songs
Dance-pop songs
New jack swing songs
Tommy Boy Records singles
Songs written by Dan Navarro